David Thomas Hynes (born 31 March 1967) is a former Australian rules footballer who played for the West Coast Eagles and Fremantle Football Club in the Australian Football League (AFL) between 1991 and 1997.

Hynes started his career at South Australian National Football League (SANFL) club Port Adelaide and was recruited by West Coast with pick 24 in the 1988 VFL Draft. He chose to remain with Port Adelaide for a time, playing in their 1988, 1989 and 1990 SANFL Premiership teams before making his AFL debut with the Eagles in Round 1, 1991 AFL season. From 1992 to 1995 he played finals football every year, including West Coast's 1994 AFL Grand Final win over Geelong.

Hynes was a versatile player who was used as a key defender, key forward or ruckman. Hynes crossed to rival club Fremantle in 1996 and spent two seasons with the club. When not selected by Fremantle during this time he represented South Fremantle in the West Australian Football League (WAFL) and was a member of their 1997 premiership team, winning the Simpson Medal for the best player in the Grand Final.

Statistics

|- style="background-color: #EAEAEA"
! scope="row" style="text-align:center" | 1991
|
| 22 || 9 || 4 || 7 || 56 || 55 || 111 || 19 || 6 || 38 || 0.4 || 0.8 || 6.2 || 6.1 || 12.3 || 2.1 || 0.7 || 4.2 || 0
|- 
! scope="row" style="text-align:center" | 1992
|
| 22 || 17 || 19 || 15 || 132 || 78 || 210 || 71 || 20 || 61 || 1.1 || 0.9 || 7.8 || 4.6 || 12.4 || 4.2 || 1.2 || 3.6 || 0
|- style="background-color: #EAEAEA"
! scope="row" style="text-align:center" | 1993
|
| 22 || 21 || 14 || 14 || 167 || 94 || 261 || 100 || 17 || 79 || 0.7 || 0.7 || 8.0 || 4.5 || 12.4 || 4.8 || 0.8 || 3.8 || 0
|- 
|style="text-align:center;background:#afe6ba;"|1994†
|
| 22 || 13 || 12 || 10 || 94 || 57 || 151 || 54 || 10 || 90 || 0.9 || 0.8 || 7.2 || 4.4 || 11.6 || 4.2 || 0.8 || 6.9 || 0
|- style="background-color: #EAEAEA"
! scope="row" style="text-align:center" | 1995
|
| 22 || 13 || 6 || 2 || 66 || 48 || 114 || 36 || 8 || 43 || 0.5 || 0.2 || 5.1 || 3.7 || 8.8 || 2.8 || 0.6 || 3.3 || 2
|- 
! scope="row" style="text-align:center" | 1996
|
| 16 || 12 || 4 || 3 || 118 || 59 || 177 || 51 || 12 || 41 || 0.3 || 0.3 || 9.8 || 4.9 || 14.8 || 4.3 || 1.0 || 3.4 || 0
|- style="background-color: #EAEAEA"
! scope="row" style="text-align:center" | 1997
|
| 16 || 1 || 0 || 0 || 3 || 1 || 4 || 1 || 0 || 3 || 0.0 || 0.0 || 3.0 || 1.0 || 4.0 || 1.0 || 0.0 || 3.0 || 0
|- class="sortbottom"
! colspan=3| Career
! 86
! 59
! 51
! 636
! 392
! 1028
! 332
! 73
! 355
! 0.7
! 0.6
! 7.4
! 4.6
! 12.0
! 3.9
! 0.8
! 4.1
! 2
|}

See also
1990 SANFL Grand Final

References

1967 births
Living people
West Coast Eagles players
West Coast Eagles Premiership players
Fremantle Football Club players
Port Adelaide Football Club (SANFL) players
Port Adelaide Football Club players (all competitions)
South Fremantle Football Club players
Australian rules footballers from South Australia
One-time VFL/AFL Premiership players